Bickford's may refer to:

 Bickford's Australia, a soft drink company originating in Adelaide, South Australia
 History of Bickford's Australia, originating as A. M. Bickford & Sons, an Adelaide pharmaceutical manufacturer
 Bickford's (restaurant), a chain of restaurants originating in New York, United States of America